Paul Christoph Mangelsdorf (born in Atchison, Kansas on July 20, 1899; died July 22, 1989) was an American botanist and agronomist, known for his work on the origins of maize.

Early life and education
His father was a Prussian immigrant and his mother was also German. He studied at Kansas State University when it was still the "Kansas State Agricultural College" and received his bachelor's degree there in 1921. In 1921 he became Donald F. Jones's assistant in Connecticut and simultaneously furthered his studies at Harvard University, attaining his doctorate in 1925 under the direction of E. M. East.

In 1927 Mangelsdorf became a researcher at the Texas Agricultural Experiment Station, where he became interested in the genetic origins of maize. In 1940 he became a professor of economic botany at Harvard and continued his research there until his retirement in 1968. After his retirement, he continued his research at the University of North Carolina, Chapel Hill.

In 1941, Mangelsdorf became an agricultural consultant for the Rockefeller Foundation and was involved in the development of Office of Special Services that became the International Maize and Wheat Improvement Center. This project would be instrumental in the Green Revolution.

Research
Mangelsdorf is noted for studying the origins and hybridization of maize. Hence he co-wrote the book The Origin of Indian Corn and Its Relatives with Robert G. Reeves. They worked on a "Tripartite theory" of origin. According to the horticultural authority Noel Kingsbury, this theory enjoyed broad support on the strength of Mangelsdorf's "undisputed... reign as the international emperor of corn." However, advances in molecular genetics discredited the tripartite model in favor of the rival position of George Beadle, which identified corn as a domesticated offspring of teosinte.

Honors and legacy
Mangelsdorf was elected to the American Academy of Arts and Sciences in 1940, the United States National Academy of Sciences in 1945, and the American Philosophical Society in 1955. He was in 1951 the president of the American Society of Naturalists, in 1955 the president of the Genetics Society of America, and in 1962 the president of the Society for Economic Botany.

Bibliography

References 

Kansas State University alumni
Harvard University alumni
American botanists
American people of German descent
1899 births
1989 deaths
People from Atchison, Kansas
American agronomists
Members of the United States National Academy of Sciences
20th-century agronomists

Members of the American Philosophical Society